Dr. Death may refer to:

People

Doctors
 Wouter Basson (born 1950), South African cardiologist and former head of the country's secret chemical and biological warfare project during the apartheid era
 Christopher Duntsch (born 1971), American neurosurgeon convicted of aggravated assault for harmful surgeries he performed
 Aribert Heim (1914–1992), Austrian doctor and one of the world's most wanted Nazi war criminals
 Jack Kevorkian (1928–2011), American physician who assisted terminally ill people to commit suicide during the 1990s
 Josef Mengele (1911–1979), German doctor and infamous Nazi war criminal
 Philip Nitschke (born 1947), Australian physician who campaigned for legal assisted suicide and subsequently assisted four people in doing so
 Jayant Patel (born 1950), Indian-born American surgeon who was accused of gross negligence whilst working in Australia
 Maxim Petrov (born 1965), Russian doctor and serial killer
 Porntip Rojanasunan (born 1955), Thai forensic pathologist
 Harold Shipman (1946–2004), British general practitioner and most prolific serial killer in British history
 Michael Swango (born 1954), American physician and serial killer
 Gunther von Hagens (born 1945), German anatomist who has a collection of dead bodies
 Santosh Pol (born 1974), Indian quack doctor and serial killer from Dhom, Satara, Maharashtra,

Athletes
 Dave Fennell (born 1952), Canadian football player
 Paul Lincoln (1932–2011), Australian professional wrestler
 Skip Thomas (1950–2011), American football player
 Steve Williams (wrestler) (1960–2009), American professional wrestler

Other people
 James Grigson (1932–2004), American psychiatrist who testified in more than 100 trials that resulted in death sentences
 Evan Harris (born 1965), British politician referred to as Dr. Death for his views on abortion and euthanasia
 Fred Leuchter (born 1943), American Holocaust denier and the country's only legal supplier of execution equipment and training
 Gerard Steenson (1957–1987), a North Irish leader of the paramilitary Irish People's Liberation Organisation
 Charles Cullen (born 1960), American nurse who murdered at least 29, possibly hundreds, of patients across the state of New Jersey

Arts and entertainment
 Doctor Death (comics), a supervillain in Batman comics
 Doctor Death (magazine), a pulp magazine in 1934–35 featuring a villainous character of that name
 "Dr. Death," a character played by Vincent Price in the 1974 horror film Madhouse
 Leslie "Dr. Death" Krunchner, a character in the HBO sitcom 1st & Ten
 "Doctor Death," a fictional movie character played by Wesley Snipes in The Expendables 3
 Dr. Death, a living marionette in the horror film Retro Puppet Master
 Doctor Death: Seeker of Souls, a 1973 horror film
 Dr. Death (1945 TV series), a 1945 television mini-series
 Dr. Death (podcast), a podcast series produced by Wondery that tells the stories of various doctors
 Dr. Death (2021 TV series), an American crime drama television limited series, based on the podcast
 Dr. Death, a 2000 novel by Jonathan Kellerman

See also
Mr Death (disambiguation)
Mr. Death: The Rise and Fall of Fred A. Leuchter, Jr., a 1999 documentary film by Errol Morris on the subject of Holocaust denial

Lists of people by nickname